Joao Luis Ortiz Pérez (born 25 September 1991) is a Chilean-Peruvian footballer, who plays as left back for Carlos A. Mannucci.

Personal life
His father is Peruvian and his mother is Chilean, so he acquired the Peruvian nationality. From his paternal line, he is the nephew of the former Peruvian footballer Eloy Ortíz who also is the nephew of the former Peruvian international footballer Eloy Campos.

References

External links
 

1991 births
Living people
People from Quillota Province
Chilean footballers
Association football fullbacks
Unión La Calera footballers
Club Deportivo Palestino footballers
Universidad de Chile footballers
Deportes La Serena footballers
Curicó Unido footballers
Deportes Melipilla footballers
Chilean Primera División players
Primera B de Chile players
Chilean people of Peruvian descent
Sportspeople of Peruvian descent
Citizens of Peru through descent
Peruvian footballers
Deportivo Municipal footballers
Real Garcilaso footballers
Sport Boys footballers
Carlos A. Mannucci players
Peruvian Primera División players
Peruvian people of Chilean descent